The 2014 Superliga Colombiana was the third edition of the Superliga Colombiana.

Deportivo Cali was the winner and qualified for the 2014 Copa Sudamericana.

Teams

Since Atlético Nacional won both the Apertura and Finalización, Deportivo Cali qualified as the 2013 Primera A aggregate table second best team.

Matches

First leg

Second leg

External links
Superliga Postobon
Superliga, Dimayor.com
Regulations

References

Superliga Colombiana
Superliga Colombiana 2014
Superliga Colombiana 2014
Superliga Colombiana